Bethel-Tate High School is a public high school in Bethel, Ohio, United States. It is the only high school in the Bethel-Tate Local School District. It has been given a rating of "Excellent" by the Ohio Board of Education for the past ten years, dating back to the 2004–2005 school year. The school mascot is the Tiger.

Sports
Bethel-Tate is part of the Southern Buckeye Athletic/Academic Conference (SBAAC).

References

External links
 

High schools in Clermont County, Ohio
Public high schools in Ohio